Owen's Defence (also known as the Queen's Fianchetto Defence or Greek Defence) is an uncommon chess opening defined by the moves:
1. e4 b6

Moreover, 1...b6 does not prepare  castling as 1...g6 does, and it is harder for Black to augment their pressure against the centre with ...f5, which weakens the kingside, than it is to play the corresponding move ...c5 after 1...g6. Owen's Defence accordingly has a dubious reputation. The move ...b6 has been played on the first or second move by grandmasters Jonathan Speelman, Pavel Blatny, Tony Miles, Edvīns Ķeņģis, and Normunds Miezis, and International Masters Bricard and Filipovic.

Instead of fianchettoing, Black can also play their bishop to the a6–f1 diagonal, the Guatemala Defence. 

Owen's Defence is classified as code B00 by the Encyclopaedia of Chess Openings.

History
The opening is named after the English vicar and strong 19th-century amateur chess player John Owen, an early exponent. Howard Staunton wrote in 1847 that 1.e4 b6, "which the Italians call 'Il Fianchetto di Donna,' although disapproved of by the earlier writers, may be made by the second player without harm, if followed speedily by [...e6] and [...c5]."

Using this opening, Owen defeated Paul Morphy in an informal game in London, 1858. An additional game in the match featuring this opening, where Owen varied on move 5, was won by Morphy.

Theory
The theory of Owen's Defence is less developed than that of other openings. This makes it attractive to some players, since their opponents will often be ill-prepared for it and hence forced to think for themselves. GM Christian Bauer observes: To be honest, I don't think Black can equalise as quickly with 1...b6 as he sometimes does in standard openings, and he may suffer against a well-prepared opponent. Then again, the well-prepared opponent is rare for such marginal variations as 1...b6, and in any case, with reasonable play I'm sure White can't get more than a slight advantage from the opening – a risk everyone is running as Black, aren't they?

According to MCO-15, after 2. d4 Bb7 White gets the advantage with either:
 3. Bd3 e6 4. Nf3 c5 5. c3 Nf6 (5...cxd4 6.cxd4 Bb4+ 7.Nc3 Nf6 8.Qe2 d5 9.e5 Ne4 10.0-0 Bxc3 11.bxc3 Nxc3 12.Qe3 Nc6 13.Bb2 Ne4 14.Ba3 and White had a large advantage in Adams–Vanderwaeren, Moscow Olympiad 1994) 6. Nbd2 Nc6 7. a3 d5 8. e5 Nfd7 9. b4 Be7 10. 0-0 0-0 11. Re1 "with a clear plus", or 
 3. Nc3 e6 4. Nf3 Bb4 5. Bd3 Nf6 6. Bg5 h6 7. Bxf6 Bxc3+ 8. bxc3 Qxf6 9. 0-0 d6 10. Nd2 e5 11. f4 Qe7 12. Qg4, as in David–Bauer, France 2005.

Black may also be able to transpose into forms of the Hippopotamus Defence, by playing ...g6 and ...Bg7, attaining a double fianchetto formation. This approach was used by GM Boris Spassky in games 12 and 16 of his 1966 World Championship match against the then World Champion Tigran Petrosian; Spassky drew both games. It had been developed and played by the Slovakian International Master Maximilian Ujtelky a few years before this.

Illustrative games

Speelman vs. Basman, British Championship 1984:
1. e4 e6 2. Nc3 b6 3. d4 Bb7 transposing to a position more commonly reached by 1.e4 b6 2.d4 Bb7 3.Nc3 e6. 4. Bd3 Nf6 5. Nge2 c5 6. d5! a6 6...exd5 7.exd5 Nxd5 8.Nxd5 Bxd5 9.Nf4 Bc6 (9...Be6 10.Be4 wins; 9...Qe7+!?) 10.Bc4! "gives White strong pressure". 7. a4 exd5 8. exd5 Nxd5 9. Nxd5 Bxd5 10. Nf4 Be6 11. Be4 Ra7 12. 0-0 Be7 Watson and Schiller also give 12...g6 13.a5! as favoring White after 13...bxa5 14.Bd2 or 13...b5 14.Be3 d6 15.b4 Be7 16.Nxe6 fxe6 17.Qg4 Qc8 18.bxc5 dxc5 19.Bh6, intending Rad1, Rfe1, and h4–h5 "with great pressure for just a pawn". 13. Ra3 0-0 14. Rg3 f5 15. Bd5 Rf6? Better is 15...Bxd5!? 16.Qxd5+ Rf7 17.Nh5 with a strong attack. 16. Re1 Bxd5 17. Qxd5+ Rf7 18. Nh5 g6 19. Bh6 Nc6 20. Rge3 (see diagram)  White threatens both 21.Rxe7! Nxe7 22.Nf6+ Kh8 23.Qxf7 and 21.Nf6+! Bxf6 (21...Kh8 22.Qxf7) 22.Re8+. On 20...gxh5, 21.Rg3+ wins; 20...Bf8 21.Re8 gxh5 23.Bxf8!; 20...Ra8 21.Rxe7! Nxe7 and now either 22.Rxe7 Qxe7 23.Qxa8+ or 22.Nf6+ Kh8 23.Qxf7 wins.

Matovinsky Gambit
A pitfall for Black in this opening, the Matovinsky Gambit, dates from a game by the 17th-century Italian chess player and writer Gioachino Greco.

Bd3 f5? Bauer calls this move "simply suicidal". Black's kingside is greatly weakened by this attempt to gain , to the extent that White can win by falling into Black's "trap". Normal is 3...e6 or 3...Nf6. Also possible is 3...g6 ("" – Andrew Martin) heading for a Hippopotamus Defence, when Martin considers 4.f4 f5! (as in the game Serpik–Blatny, U.S. Open 2003) strong for Black. 4. exf5! Bxg2 5. Qh5+ g6 6. fxg6 (diagram) Nf6 7. gxh7+ Nxh5 8. Bg6# 1–0

A better try for Black is 6...Bg7! Staunton wrote in 1847 that White got the advantage with 7.gxh7+ Kf8 8.hxg8=Q+ Kxg8 9.Qg4 Bxh1 10.h4 e6 11.h5. Over 120 years later, Black improved on this analysis with both 10...Qf8 ("!" – Soltis) 11.h5 Qf6 12.h6 Rxh6 13.Bxh6 Qxh6 Hendler–Radchenko, Kiev 1970 and 10...Bd5 ("!" – Kapitaniak) 11.h5 Be6 12.Qg2 Rxh5 Schmit–Vitolins, Latvia 1969, winning quickly in both games. However, White is winning after 7.Qf5! (instead of 7.gxh7+) Nf6 8.Bh6 Bxh6 (on 8...Kf8, White wins with 9.Bxg7+ Kxg7 10.gxh7 Bxh1 11.Qg6+ Kf8 12.Qh6+ Kf7 transposing to the 9...Bxh1 line below, or 9.Qg5 Bxh1 10.gxh7) 9.gxh7 and now: 
9...Kf8 10.Qg6 Bc1 11.Qxg2 Bxb2 12.Ne2 "and Rg1 will prove lethal"; or 
9...Bxh1 10.Qg6+ Kf8 11.Qxh6+ Kf7 12.Nh3 with a winning attack. Den Broeder–Wegener, correspondence 1982, concluded 12...Qf8 13.Bg6+ Ke6 14.Qf4 d5 15.Bf5+ Kf7 16.Ng5+ Ke8 17.Qxc7 1–0.
9...e6! 10.Qg6+ Ke7 11.Qxg2 and White is two pawns up and Black's king is exposed, but Black is not immediately losing and has avoided the worst, and the pawn on h7 will fall.

According to both Soltis and Kapitaniak, 7.gxh7+ Kf8 8.Nf3! (which Soltis attributes to F. A. Spinhoven of the Netherlands) is also strong: 
8...Bxf3? 9.Qxf3+ Nf6 10.Qxa8; 
8...Bxh1 9.Ne5 Bxe5 (9...Qe8 10.Ng6+) 10.dxe5 Bd5 11.hxg8=Q+ Kxg8 12.Qg6+ Kf8 13.Bh6+; 
8...Nf6 9.Qg6 Bxh1 10.Bh6 Rxh7 (10...Bxh6 11.Qxh6+ Kf7 12.Ng5+) 11.Ng5 Bxh6 12.Nxh7+ Nxh7 13.Qxh6+; or 
8...Nf6 9.Qg6 Bxf3 10.Rg1 Rxh7 11.Qg3!! Be4 12.Bxe4 Nxe4 13.Qf3+ Kg8 14.Qxe4 Nc6 (14...d5 15.Qe6+ Kh8 16.Nc3) 15.Bf4 with an extra pawn for White. Boris Avrukh also recommends this line, and notes that 13...Nf6 (instead of 13...Kg8) 14.Qxa8 Rxh2 15.Bf4 Rh4 16.Qg2 Rg4 17.Qh2 leaves White "an exchange up with an easily winning position".

Watson writes that although 7.Qf5! is the "traditional" refutation and does indeed win, "the analysis is complicated", and Spinhoven's 8.Nf3! "is clearer".

Guatemala Defence

Instead of fianchettoing, Black can proceed differently by playing their queen's bishop to a6, the Guatemala Defence, so-named because the Guatemala Chess Club used the line in a 1949 correspondence game. Andrew Soltis writes that it has "no other discernible benefit than to get out of 'book' as quickly as possible". Joel Benjamin and Eric Schiller see some logic in Black's concept to exchange the light-squared bishop as soon as possible, as it often proves troublesome for Black in many openings. White gets the advantage with 2.d4 Ba6 3.Bxa6 Nxa6 4.Nf3 Qc8!? 5.0-0 Qb7 6.Re1 e6 7.c4.

The Guatemalan bishop deployment can also occur on Black's third move, from various transpositions. For example, after 1.e4 b6 2.d4 e6, 1.e4 e6 2.d4 b6, or 1.d4 b6 2.e4 e6, Black can follow up in all cases with 3...Ba6.

See also
 List of chess openings
 List of chess openings named after people

References

External links

 Marcin Maciaga, Flexible System of Defensive Play for Black – 1...b6

Chess openings